Jared Artaud is an American musician and producer. He is primarily known for his work with the electro psych duo The Vacant Lots. He is also an established poet who lives in New York City.

Biography 
Jared Artaud is an American musician and producer born in New York City. 
He is the co-founder, guitarist, vocalist and songwriter of electro psych band The Vacant Lots. In 2014, The Vacant Lots released their debut album "Departure" and Artaud released his first book of poetry entitled "Empty Space" He also co-produced and designed the artwork for The Vacant Lots debut album "Departure" on Sonic Cathedral. In 2017, he co-produced The Vacant Lots "Endless Night" album on Metropolis and the final album "IT" by Alan Vega posthumously released on Fader. In 2018, Artaud released his second book of poetry "Tomorrow" on Savage Night and in 2020, Artaud co-produced and wrote The Vacant Lots third album, "Interzone". In 2021, Artaud co-produced, mixed, and did art direction on the lost Alan Vega album entitled "Mutator" released on Sacred Bones Records. Artaud currently lives and works in Brooklyn, New York.

Discography
For recordings made with The Vacant Lots, please see The Vacant Lots discography.

Books 
Tomorrow – (Savage Night, 2018)

Empty Space – (Dactyl Poetry, 2014)

References

External links
 Official Instagram
 The Vacant Lots official website

Living people
American rock musicians
Psychedelic musicians
Musicians from New York City
American post-punk musicians
American experimental musicians
21st-century American poets
21st-century American musicians
American performance artists
Artists from New York City
American indie rock musicians
Year of birth missing (living people)